Crossbank is an area of Lees, a village in the Metropolitan Borough of Oldham, Greater Manchester, England.

Historically a part of Lancashire, the name Crossbank is thought to derive from the days of the Knights Templar when a cross was etched into an earthen bank to denote lands granted to them.

Prior to 1894, Crossbank had formed a hamlet linked with the parish of Ashton-under-Lyne, and lying within the Oldham parliamentary borough. Following the Local Government Act 1894, Crossbank constituted one of seven civil parishes within the Limehurst Rural District and administrative county of Lancashire. Unlike the other six parishes, Crossbank was an exclave of Limehurst lying to the north, bordering Lees and Waterhead in Oldham. In 1914, owing to urbanisation, the civil parish was abolished and its area incorporated into the Lees Urban District.

References

Areas of Greater Manchester
Geography of the Metropolitan Borough of Oldham